XHQI-FM is a station in Monterrey, Nuevo León, Mexico. Owned by the state government of Nuevo León, XHQI broadcasts on 102.1 FM from a transmitter site on Cerro El Mirador and carries a public radio format known as Radio Nuevo León 102.1 FM.

History
XHQI was the first state-owned broadcast station in Nuevo León, coming to air in 1978 as "Radio Gobierno". XEQI-AM followed the next year, and services in rural Nuevo León were opened in the 1980s.

For most of its history, it was Opus 102 with a classical music format. The July 2017 decision to move Opus to 1510 AM and launch a new station, Libertad 102, focused around popular music met with criticism in the cultural community.

References

Radio stations established in 1978
Radio stations in Monterrey